U.C. Sampdoria fell short of repeating its successful 1984–85 season, ending up in 12th position in the league. It did almost defend its cup title successfully, but despite a 2–1 victory in the first leg, it lost to Roma in the return leg. Sampdoria's European adventure did not live up to expectations, it not even reaching the quarter finals of the Cup Winners' Cup.

Squad

Goalkeepers
  Ivano Bordon
  Roberto Bocchino

Defenders
  Moreno Mannini
  Pietro Vierchowod
  Luca Pellegrini
  Andrea Veronici
  Roberto Galia
  Antonio Paganin
  Massimiliano Fiondella

Midfielders
  Fabio Aselli
  Fausto Pari
  Graeme Souness
  Alessandro Scanziani
  Fausto Salsano
  Gianfranco Matteoli

Attackers
  Maurizio Ganz
  Giuseppe Lorenzo
  Trevor Francis
  Roberto Mancini
  Gianluca Vialli

Competitions

Serie A

League table

Matches

Topscorers
  Roberto Mancini 6
  Gianluca Vialli 6
  Giuseppe Lorenzo 3
  Graeme Souness 3

Coppa Italia 

First Round

Eightfinals 

Quarterfinals 

Semifinals

Final

European Cup Winners' Cup

Third round

Eightfinals

References

Sources
RSSSF - Italy 1985/86

U.C. Sampdoria seasons
Sampdoria